Nature Materials, is a peer-reviewed scientific journal published by Nature Publishing Group. It was launched in September 2002. Vincent Dusastre is the launching and current chief editor.

Aims and scope
Nature Materials is focused on all topics within the combined disciplines of materials science and engineering. Topics published in the journal are presented from the view of the impact that materials research has on other scientific disciplines such as (for example) physics, chemistry, and biology. Coverage in this journal encompasses fundamental research and applications from synthesis to processing, and from structure to composition. Coverage also includes basic research and applications of properties and performance of materials. Materials are specifically described as "substances in the condensed states (liquid, solid, colloidal)", and which are "designed or manipulated for technological ends." 

Furthermore, Nature Materials functions as a forum for the materials scientist community.  Interdisciplinary research results are published, obtained from across all areas of materials research, and between scientists involved in the different disciplines. The readership for this journal are scientists, in both academia and industry involved in either developing materials or working with materials-related concepts. Finally, Nature Materials perceives materials research as significantly influential on the development of society.

Coverage
Research areas covered in the journal include: 

 Engineering and structural materials (metals, alloys, ceramics, composites)
 Organic and soft materials (glasses, colloids, liquid crystals, polymers)
 Bio-inspired, biomedical and biomolecular materials
 Optical, photonic and optoelectronic materials
 Magnetic materials
 Materials for electronics
 Superconducting materials
 Catalytic and separation materials
 Materials for energy
 Nanoscale materials and processes
 Computation, modelling and materials theory
 Surfaces and thin films
 Design, synthesis, processing and characterization techniques

In addition to primary research, Nature Materials also publishes review articles, news and views, research highlights about important papers published in other journals, commentaries, correspondence, interviews and analysis of the broad field of materials science.

Abstracting and indexing
Nature Materials is indexed in the following databases:
Chemical Abstracts Service – CASSI
Science Citation Index 
Science Citation Index Expanded 
Current Contents – Physical, Chemical & Earth Sciences 
BIOSIS Previews

References

External links
 Nature Materials
 Nature Materials editors

Nature Research academic journals
Materials science journals
Monthly journals
English-language journals
Publications established in 2002